= 1933–34 Plunket Shield season =

Cricket tournament in New Zealand

1933–34 Plunket Shield
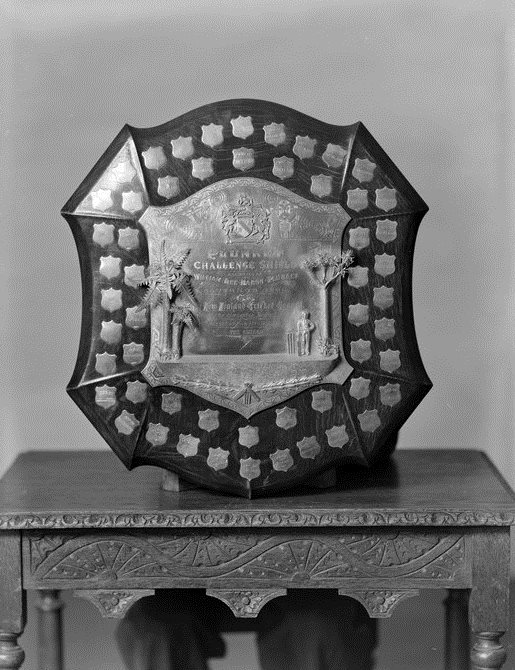
- The Plunket Shield trophy
- Cricket format: First-class
- Tournament format(s): Round-robin
- Champions: Auckland (4th title)
- Participants: 4
- Matches: 6

The 1933–34 Plunket Shield season was a tournament of the Plunket Shield, the domestic first-class cricket competition of New Zealand.

Auckland won the championship, finishing at the top of the points table at the end of the round-robin tournament between the four first-class sides, Auckland, Canterbury, Otago and Wellington.

== Table ==
Below are the Plunket Shield standings for the season:

| Team | Played | Won | Lost | Drawn | Points | NetRpW |
|---|---|---|---|---|---|---|
| Auckland | 3 | 2 | 0 | 1 | 20 | 7.117 |
| Otago | 3 | 2 | 1 | 0 | 16 | 2.100 |
| Canterbury | 3 | 1 | 2 | 0 | 8 | -4.367 |
| Wellington | 3 | 0 | 2 | 1 | 2 | -5.520 |
